Whatcha See Is Whatcha Get is the debut studio album by American R&B group The Dramatics, released in 1971 via Volt Records and Stax Records. It peaked at #20 on the Billboard 200 and #5 on the Billboard R&B chart.

Three singles were released from the album: "Whatcha See Is Whatcha Get", "Get Up and Get Down" and "In the Rain". "Thankful for Your Love" (originally appearing on the album as "Thank You for Your Love") was also issued as a promotional single. "In the Rain" was the most successful single from the album, peaking at #5 on the Billboard Hot 100 in 1972. "Get Up and Get Down" was featured in Dead Presidents.

Critical reception 

Reviewing in Christgau's Record Guide: Rock Albums of the Seventies (1981), Village Voice critic Robert Christgau wrote of the album: "Sounds like better Motown than recently and greasier Motown than ever, and it figures—this Tempts-styled Detroit quintet, with Ron Banks in the David Ruffin role, play for the Memphis Grease Kings. 'Get Up and Get Down' and 'Watcha See Is Whatcha Get' resound with uptempo bottom, and while I find the big dramatic number, 'In the Rain,' a little too big and too dramatic, I do prefer Don Davis's sound effects to Norman Whitfield's. Better filler than Motown, too—but not that much better."

Track listing

Charts

Weekly charts

Year-end charts

References

External links
 
 
 The Original Album Cover (1972)

1971 debut albums
The Dramatics albums
Volt Records albums